The Chase Tower is a 22-story,  high-rise building in downtown Milwaukee, Wisconsin. Built in the International style, the building has a very dark green, almost black, facade.  It is located alongside the Milwaukee River, at the corner of East Wisconsin Avenue and North Water Street. The Chase Tower includes  of office space and a 746-space parking structure.

Presently, the building is home to a Chase Bank branch and underground vault, the studios of Milwaukee Public Radio (WUWM), a few eateries, and numerous office tenants including JPMorgan Chase, Infinity Healthcare, Empower Retirement, and law firm O’Neil, Cannon, Hollman, DeJong & Laing.  Skywalks connect it to its parking structure to the south and the Shops of Grand Avenue across the river via the ASQ Center.

History 
The building was completed in 1961, and was formerly known as Bank One Plaza until their merger with Chase. Before that, it was home to Marine Bank and was known as the Marine Plaza.  In 2016, the building was sold to 111 E. Wisconsin Property Owner, LLC, and is managed by Farbman Group.

Currently, it is the 13th tallest building in Milwaukee.  It was the second tallest building in Milwaukee from 1961 to 1973, when U.S. Bank Center was completed.

In June 2016, the Farbman Group acquired the building for $30.5 million from Brookfield Real Estate Opportunity Fund. They have since made significant updates to the lobbies, common areas and amenity space on the first and second floors, as well as the attached parking structure.

See also

List of tallest buildings in Milwaukee

References

External links

JPMorgan Chase buildings
Skyscraper office buildings in Milwaukee
Harrison & Abramovitz buildings
Office buildings completed in 1961